Psittiparus is a genus of bird in the family Paradoxornithidae.

Species
Established by Carl Eduard Hellmayr in 1903, it contains four species:

The genus name Psittiparus is a combination of the Latin words psittacus, meaning "parrot" and parus, meaning "tit".

References

 
Bird genera
Parrotbills